The Wabash Little Giants football program is a college football team that represents Wabash College in the North Coast Athletic Conference, a part of the NCAA Division III.  The team has had 33 head coaches since its first recorded football game in 1884. The current coach is Don Morel who first took the position for the 2016 season.

Key

Coaches

Notes

References

Lists of college football head coaches

Indiana sports-related lists